Kristian Kuzmanovic (born 6 May 1988) is a Dutch footballer playing in Switzerland. He plays as a midfielder or striker for FC Wohlen. He is the son of the Croatia-born Dutch footballer  who was manager of FC Winterthur from 2009 to 2014.

References

1988 births
Living people
Dutch footballers
Dutch people of Serbian descent
Dutch people of Croatian descent
Dutch expatriate sportspeople in Switzerland
Swiss Challenge League players
FC Winterthur players
FC Vaduz players
FC Schaffhausen players
Expatriate footballers in Switzerland
Expatriate footballers in Liechtenstein
Association football midfielders
Association football forwards
Footballers from Rotterdam
Dutch expatriate sportspeople in Liechtenstein
Dutch expatriate footballers